Gottlieb Haberlandt (28 November 1854 – 30 January 1945) was an Austrian botanist. He was the son of European 'soybean' pioneer Professor Friedrich J. Haberlandt. His son Ludwig Haberlandt was an early reproductive physiologist now given credit as the 'grandfather' of the birth control pill.

Haberlandt first pointed out the possibilities of the culture of isolated tissues, plant tissue culture. He suggested that the potentialities of individual cells via tissue culture and also suggested that the reciprocal influences of tissues on one another could be determined by this method. Since Haberlandt's original assertions methods for tissue and cell culture have been realized, leading to significant discoveries in Biology and Medicine. His original idea presented in 1902 was called totipotentiality: “Theoretically all plant cells are able to give rise to a complete plant.”

The more efficient C-4 photosynthesis in land plants  first described by Gottlieb Haberlandt in 1904.

References

Further reading

1854 births
1945 deaths
People from Mosonmagyaróvár
Hungarian-German people
19th-century Hungarian botanists
19th-century Austrian botanists
Corresponding Members of the Russian Academy of Sciences (1917–1925)
Corresponding Members of the USSR Academy of Sciences
Austrian people of Hungarian descent
20th-century Austrian botanists